The Alexandra Rose Day is a charitable fund raising event held in June in the United Kingdom since 1912 by Alexandra Rose Charities. It was first launched on the 50th anniversary of the arrival of Queen Alexandra from her native Denmark to the United Kingdom. She requested that the anniversary be marked by the sale of roses in London to raise funds for her favourite charities.
 
The arrival of Princess Alexandra of Denmark in the United Kingdom for her marriage to the Prince of Wales (later King Edward VII) in 1863 was a never-to-be-forgotten occasion. This was attributable to the then recent increase in the railway network, the lack of royal occasions in preceding years and the new process of photography, which had made it possible for pictures of the Princess to be sold in shops prior to the arrival. The City of London spent £40,000 on decorations and illuminations, and the result was a tumultuous reception for the bride.

When the 50th anniversary of her arrival and wedding came, Queen Alexandra's admirers insisted that it should be celebrated in a special way. A processional drive through the streets of London seemed an obvious choice, but Alexandra wanted an occasion that would help the sick and needy. She developed an idea which would benefit the funds of London hospitals through the sale of artificial wild roses, which were to be made by young women and girls with disabilities at the John Groom Industrial Training Home.

The day was to be called "Alexandra Rose Day", and the initial drive swept Londoners off their feet. The first event raised £32,000 (the equivalent of almost £2 million in 2002 money). The funds raised were a great benefit to hospitals, and the annual drive became an institution, one of the chief attractions of London's summer, with Alexandra the star. By 1920, £775,000 for London hospitals had been raised.

Queen Alexandra's Rose Day continued to be celebrated even after her death in 1925. Rare Autochrome colour photos exist of women selling paper roses with poster billboards and decorated collecting cans in Seaford, East Sussex on the 'Seventeenth Celebration Alexandra Day in memory of H.M Queen Alexandra Saturday June 16, 1928.'

After a period of raising money for charities that do not normally get national attention for fundraising, today Alexandra Rose Charities is tackling food poverty in London, most notably through providing vouchers for disadvantaged families to buy fresh fruit and vegetables.

The Prime Minister traditionally launches the day by being the first to buy a rose.

Princess Alexandra, The Honourable Lady Ogilvy, Queen Alexandra's great-granddaughter, is the current president of Alexandra Rose Day.

Notes

External links
1928 colour photos of Rose Sellers
Alexandra Rose Charity official site
Alexandra Rose Charities homepage

Charities based in Surrey
1912 establishments in the United Kingdom
Recurring events established in 1912
Annual events in the United Kingdom
Alexandra of Denmark